Benzoquinone (C6H4O2) is a quinone with a single benzene ring. There are 2 (out of 3 hypothetical) benzoquinones:
 1,4-Benzoquinone, most commonly, right image (also para-benzoquinone, p-benzoquinone, para-quinone, or just quinone)
 1,2-Benzoquinone, less commonly, left image (also ortho-benzoquinone, o-benzoquinone, ortho-quinone)

1,3-benzoquinone "does not exist, because its structure would be nonplanar and highly strained", though derivatives are known.

An alkylated p-benzoquinone has been found in the rhizomes of Iris kemaonensis.

See also 
 Arene substitution pattern

References